The 2004 Chevy American Revolution 400 was the 11th stock car race of the 2004 NASCAR Nextel Cup Series season and the 50th iteration of the event. The race was held on Saturday, May 15, 2004, before a crowd of 115,000 in Richmond, Virginia, at Richmond International Raceway, a 0.75 miles (1.21 km) D-shaped oval. The race took the scheduled 400 laps to complete. At race's end, Dale Earnhardt, Inc. driver Dale Earnhardt Jr. would cruise on the final restart to win his 12th career NASCAR Nextel Cup Series win and his third win of the season. To fill out the podium, Jimmie Johnson of Hendrick Motorsports and Bobby Labonte of Joe Gibbs Racing would finish second and third, respectively.

Background 

Richmond International Raceway (RIR) is a 3/4-mile (1.2 km), D-shaped, asphalt race track located just outside Richmond, Virginia in Henrico County. It hosts the NASCAR Cup Series, Xfinity Series and the NASCAR Camping World Truck Series. Known as "America's premier short track", it formerly hosted an IndyCar Series race and two USAC sprint car races.

Entry list

Practice

First practice 
The first practice session was held on Friday, May 14, at 11:20 AM EST, and would last for two hours.

Second and final practice 
The second and final practice session, sometimes referred to as Happy Hour, was held on Friday, May 14, at 6:00 PM EST, and would last for one hour and 15 minutes.

Qualifying 
Qualifying was held on Friday, May 14, at 3:10 PM EST. Each driver would have two laps to set a fastest time; the fastest of the two would count as their official qualifying lap. Positions 1-38 would be decided on time, while positions 39-43 would be based on provisionals. Four spots are awarded by the use of provisionals based on owner's points. The fifth is awarded to a past champion who has not otherwise qualified for the race. If no past champ needs the provisional, the next team in the owner points will be awarded a provisional.

At the time, Vickers was the youngest ever pole-sitter.

Two drivers would crash during qualifying. First, Ricky Craven would slam the wall on his second lap, damaging the rear end of his car. Then, Kasey Kahne would crash on his first lap. While both had qualified, they would be forced to start at the rear for the race for switching to a backup car. In addition, the #9 team was forced to use a provisional.

Two drivers would fail to qualify: Stanton Barrett and Kirk Shelmerdine.

Full qualifying results

Race results

References 

2004 NASCAR Nextel Cup Series
NASCAR races at Richmond Raceway
May 2004 sports events in the United States
2004 in sports in Virginia